Leptofreya is a genus of spiders in the family Salticidae. It was first described in 2015 by G. B. Edwards. It is found in the Americas from the United States to Brazil.

Species
, the World Spider Catalog lists the following species in the genus:
 Leptofreya ambigua (C. L. Koch, 1846) – Colombia to French Guiana, Brazil, introduced to United States
 Leptofreya bifurcata (F. O. Pickard-Cambridge, 1901) – Mexico, Panama
 Leptofreya laticava (F. O. Pickard-Cambridge, 1901) – Guatemala
 Leptofreya longispina (F. O. Pickard-Cambridge, 1901) – Guatemala, Panama

References

Salticidae
Salticidae genera
Spiders of Mexico
Spiders of Central America
Spiders of South America